Simple Things is the 8th album by American singer-songwriter Carole King, released in 1977. It is her first album on the Avatar / Capitol label.

Cash Box said of the title song that it "lives up to the philosophy of its title and lyric" and "has a deceptively simple melody that draws the listener in after a few short seconds."

Track listing
All tracks written by Carole King, except as noted below.
Side one
"Simple Things" (King, Rick Evers)　– 2:41
"Hold On" (King, Evers)　– 4:37
"In the Name of Love"　– 3:04
"Labyrinth"　– 4:03
"You're the One Who Knows"　– 5:05
Side two
"Hard Rock Cafe"　– 3:44
"Time Alone"　– 2:37
"God Only Knows" – 6:19
"To Know That I Love You" (King, Evers)　– 3:31
"One"　– 5:04

Personnel
Carole King - piano, vocals, background vocals
Rick Evers – guitar
Robert McEntee - guitar, keyboards, background vocals
Michael Rivera - percussion
Rob Galloway - bass
Mark Hallman - guitar, keyboards, background vocals
Michael Wooten - drums
Louise Goffin - background vocals
Sherry Goffin - background vocals
Nolan Smith – trumpet, flugelhorn
Maurice Spears – bass trombone
Terry Harrington – baritone saxophone
Oscar Brashear – trumpet, flugelhorn	
Ernie Watts – tenor saxophone
George Bohanon – trombone, horn arrangement
Robert Dubow - violin
Charles Veal – violin
Ken Yerke – violin
David Campbell – viola
Dennis Karmazyn – cello

Production notes
Produced by Carole King and Norm Kinney
Engineered by Norm Kinney and Milt Calice
Steve Katz – assistant engineer
James Tuttle – sound assistance
Bernie Grundman – mastering
Roy Reynolds – illustrations and photography
Rick Evers – label design
Terry Kruger – label art
Roy Kohara and Roy Reynolds – art direction

Charts

Weekly charts

Year-end charts

Certifications

References

External links
Carole King discography.

1977 albums
Carole King albums
Capitol Records albums
Albums recorded at A&M Studios